There are approximately fourteen nationally recognized public holidays in Uganda.

Main Holidays

References 

 
Ugandan culture
Uganda